David Glover is a geneticist.

David Glover may also refer to:

David Delano Glover (1868–1952), politician
David Carr Glover (1925–1988), American pianist
David Glover (The Inbetweeners)
David Glover (actor) (1927–2015), English television actor